Kristina Bille (born 3 April 1986) is a Danish team handball player. She plays on the Danish national team, and participated at the 2011 World Women's Handball Championship in Brazil.

Individual awards 
 All-Star Best player of the Danish 1st Division: 2015/16, 2016/17

References

External links

1986 births
Living people
Danish female handball players